Pilzán is a locality located in the municipality of Benabarre, in Huesca province, Aragon, Spain. As of 2020, it has a population of 10.

Geography 
Pilzán is located 106km east of Huesca.

References

Populated places in the Province of Huesca